Aigrain is a surname. Notable people with the surname include:

Philippe Aigrain (1949–2021), French computer scientist, activist, and researcher
Pierre Aigrain (1924–2002), French physicist
Suzanne Aigrain (born 1979), professor of astrophysics